The 2007 National Lacrosse League season, the 21st in the history of the NLL (including the Eagle Pro Box Lacrosse League and Major Indoor Lacrosse League years) began on December 30, 2006 and concluded with the championship game on May 12, 2007.

The Rochester Knighthawks finished the regular season with a 14–2 record, winning their last 12 games. They followed this up by beating Toronto in the first round, and then clinched the Eastern division title by defeating Buffalo in the Eastern division finals, with league MVP John Grant, Jr. scoring in overtime.

The Arizona Sting finished third in their division, but defeated the Calgary Roughnecks in the first round, and then beat the San Jose Stealth to clinch their second division title in three years. The championship game was awarded to Rochester because of their higher seed, but the Blue Cross Arena was unavailable on the day of the game, so the Championship game was held in Phoenix.

The Knighthawks continued their winning streak in the desert, defeating the Sting 13–11. John Grant, Jr., who had been named the league MVP only two days before, was named game MVP.  It was Rochester's second championship overall, and first since 1997. The championship game loss was Arizona's second in three years.

The season began with a blockbuster trade just three days before the first game, as the Toronto Rock traded star forward and 2005 MVP Colin Doyle along with Darren Halls and a draft pick to the San Jose Stealth for 1st round draft selection Ryan Benesch, Kevin Fines, Chad Thompson, and two draft picks. Doyle scored nine assists in San Jose's second game of the season, a 17–16 OT win over the Calgary Roughnecks, and finished the season second in team scoring. Benesch was named 2007 Rookie of the Year.

In February, the NLL signed an agreement with Sirius Satellite Radio to air a "Game of the Week" throughout the season as well as during the playoffs. In March, the league announced that New York Titans star Casey Powell would be hosting a weekly radio show on SIRIUS, called Inside the National Lacrosse League with Casey Powell.

Final standings

Toronto won the 3-way tiebreaker with Philadelphia and Chicago due to their 5–7 record against divisional opponents (Philadelphia was 4–8, and Chicago was 5–8).
Calgary won the 3-way tiebreaker with Arizona and San Jose because of their head-to-head record (Calgary was 2–1 against Arizona and 1–1 against San Jose, while San Jose went 0–2 against Arizona).

Playoffs

The Knighthawks had the overall top seed in the playoffs, but were unable to host the Championship game due to a scheduling conflict at the Blue Cross Arena.

Team movement
The 2007 season features two new expansion teams, both in the East Division: the Chicago Shamrox and the New York Titans.

Rule changes
A number of rule changes were made for the 2007 season. The main changes are:
 Cross-checks to the head are more severely punished
 Cross-checking a player without the ball is now illegal
 Scoring from behind the net is now allowed, provided there is no contact between the ball and the goalie or his equipment (this effectively allows the "Air Gait" move invented by Gary Gait)
 When a penalty shot is awarded, the coach can choose any player on the team to take the shot

Milestones
 January 6:
 Chicago and New York played their first ever games
 Chicago recorded its first win and first home win
 New York's first goal was scored by Gewas Schindler
 Chicago's first goal was scored by Jason Clark
 Edmonton won its first ever home game, defeating the Philadelphia Wings 13–12
 January 12: San Jose beat Calgary 17–16 in overtime in the longest game in NLL history. The game lasted 71 minutes and 42 seconds before Luke Wiles scored at 11:42 of overtime, narrowly beating the old record of 70:45 during an Arizona-Anaheim game in 2004.
 January 20: New York records its first win and first home win at Madison Square Garden with an 11–9 victory over the Chicago Shamrox. The game is also the first loss for the Shamrox.
 January 26: New York plays their first game at Nassau Veterans Memorial Coliseum, losing 16–11 to the Philadelphia Wings. The New York Titans will split their home games between the Coliseum and Madison Square Garden.
 January 27: Rochester Knighthawk star John Grant Jr. sets a new NLL record for points in a single game with 15 (9 goals, 6 assists) in a 22–18 defeat of the New York Titans.
 February 22: After a 12–9 loss to Toronto, the Calgary Roughnecks fired head coach Chris Hall, the only coach in team history.
 March 24: Calgary teammates Kaleb Toth and Tracey Kelusky both reach 500 career points in the same game, as Jeff Dowling wins his first game as head coach.
 March 31:
 Rochester beats Philadelphia 12–10 in Rochester, setting a new franchise record with their ninth consecutive win.
 The 1,000th regular-season game in league history is played at Xcel Energy Center in Saint Paul, with Colorado defeating Minnesota 11–9.
 April 6: The Calgary Roughnecks play their 100th game in franchise history against the Edmonton Rush at the Pengrowth Saddledome in Calgary.

All Star Game
The 2007 All-Star Game was held at the Rose Garden Arena in Portland, Oregon on March 10, 2007. The East won the game 20–16, on the strength of Mark Steenhuis' six goals. Steenhuis was named game MVP. Steenhuis was also named game MVP in the 2004 All-Star game, and became the first player in NLL history to be named All-Star Game MVP twice. The game was broadcast on Sirius Satellite Radio; Travis Demers and Martin Wright called the action.

All-Star teams

* Unable to play due to personal reasons
** Unable to play due to injury
*** Unable to play due to family commitments

Awards

Annual

All-Pro Teams
First Team
 John Tavares, Buffalo
 John Grant, Jr., Rochester
 Dan Dawson, Arizona
 Steve Toll, Rochester
 Ryan Cousins, Minnesota
 Anthony Cosmo, San Jose

Second Team
 Gavin Prout, Colorado
 Colin Doyle, San Jose
 Casey Powell, New York
 Lewis Ratcliff, Calgary
 Shawn Williams, Rochester
 Nick Patterson, Minnesota

All-Rookie Team
Ryan Benesch, Toronto
Geoff Snider, Philadelphia
Athan Iannucci, Philadelphia
Bill McGlone, Chicago
Nenad Gajic, Colorado
Jamie Shewchuk, Colorado

Weekly awards
The NLL gives out awards weekly for the best overall player, best offensive player, best transition player (new for 2007), best defensive player, and best rookie.

Monthly awards
Awards are also given out monthly for the best overall player and best rookie.

Statistics leaders
Bold numbers indicate new single-season records. Italics indicate tied single-season records.

See also
 2007 in sports

References

External links
 2007 NLL schedule
 2007 NLL standings

07
National Lacrosse League